Local elections were held in Pasay on May 10, 2004 within the Philippine general election. The voters elected for the elective local posts in the city: the mayor, vice mayor, the representative for the lone district, and the councilors, six of them in the two districts of the city.

Background 
Mayor Wenceslao "Peewee" Trinidad ran for second term. His running mate was Vice Mayor Antonino "Tony" Calixto.

Retired Police Ricardo "Ding" Santos, former security aide of the late former Mayor Pablo Cuneta, ran for mayoralty post. His partner was former Vice Mayor Gregorio "Greg" Alcera.

Rep. Ma. Consuelo "Connie" Dy ran for a second term. Her opponent was Second District Councilor Imelda Calixto-Rubiano.

Candidates

Administration's Ticket

Team Trinidad Calixto

Opposition's Ticket

Team Kaibigan

Results 
Names written in bold-Italic are the re-elected incumbents while in italic are incumbents lost in elections.

For Representative 
Rep. Ma. Consuelo "Connie" Dy won over Second District Councilor Imelda "Emi" Calixto-Rubiano.

For Mayor 
Mayor Wenceslao Trinidad defeated retired police officer Ricardo "Ding" Santos.,who happened to be his opponent in a recall election in 2000.

For Vice Mayor 
Vice Mayor Antonino "Tony" Calixto was re-elected. He won in a tight election to former Vice Mayor Gregorio "Greg" Alcera.

For Councilors

First District
Four of the six incumbents were re-elected. Ma. Antonia "Tonya" Cuneta and Richard Advincula sealed her seat as newly duly elected councilor of the district. Advincula replaced his father, three-termer councilor Eduardo "Ed" Advincula.

Councilors Reynaldo Mateo and Ma. Luisa Petallo failed to secure their seats, placing 7th and 8th, respectively.

|-bgcolor=black
|colspan=5|

Second District 
Four of the six incumbents were re-elected.  

Noel "Onie" Bayona, a former police officer, and cousin of Mayor Wenceslao "Peewee" Trinidad, placing 2nd, is the newly-elected councilor. Another newly-elected councilor, Irish Padua-Pineda, daughter of three-termer Councilor Reynaldo Padua, placed 6th. 

Councilor Imelda "Emi" Calixto-Rubiano ran as representative but lost to re-electionist  Ma. Consuelo "Connie" Dy. 

|-bgcolor=black
|colspan=5|

Note 
Due to limited sources online (including copy of election results), only 1 citation was made (PhilStar news article titled: Peewee proclaimed in Pasay; written by Edu Punay on May 18, 2004). Another reason for limited source was because the election took place when news are commonly flashed in television, radios, and newspapers, and rarely in Internet.

References

Elections in Pasay
2004 Philippine local elections
2004 elections in Metro Manila